The discography of South Korean rapper and singer Eun Jiwon consists of six studio albums, one compilation album, one single album, and three extended plays.

Albums

Studio albums

Compilation albums

Single albums

Extended plays

Singles

As a lead artist

As a featured artist

Production credits

Other appearances

2008: "Movement 4" — Bizzy & Movement (무브먼트)

References

Hip hop discographies
Discographies of South Korean artists
K-pop discographies